This is a list of commercial video games released as freeware; games that, in their original license, were not considered freeware, but were re-released at a later date with a freeware license, sometimes as publicity for a forthcoming sequel or compilation release.

Some of the following games are not freely redistributable software, as they have only been made available as a free download as freeware, but may only be downloaded from certain websites and with the explicit permission of the copyright owner. Consult the software license agreement.

For games that were originally released as freeware, see List of freeware video games. For free and open-source games, and proprietary games re-released as FLOSS, see List of open source video games. For proprietary games with released source code (and proprietary or freeware content), see List of commercial video games with available source code.

Available games
The following formerly paid games have been made available as freeware, and are still in that status:

Games no longer freely distributed
The following are commercial games that were once released as free downloads but were not freely redistributable software.
 Airborne Ranger (1988), a stealth 2D game by MicroProse. It was released as freeware by Atari to promote Airborne Rangers. A free registration was required to download the game. After Airborne Rangers wasn't released, the Airborne Ranger page and the download link were removed. The game is still mentioned as freeware and many forums and sites have the now dead link to the game page. The legal situation now is unclear because the installer has no disclaimer.
 Area 51 (2005), a first person shooter by Midway Games. Its free release was sponsored by the US Air Force. It later changed hands and its freeware status was removed.
 B-17 Flying Fortress (1992), a flight simulator by MicroProse.
 Battlefield 1942 (2002), a first person shooter by Electronic Arts, was available on Origin until it was removed, due to GameSpy shutting down.
 Betrayal at Krondor (1993), a role-playing game by Dynamix.
 Caesar (1992), a city-building game by Sierra.
 Dragonsphere (1994), a point-and-click graphic adventure game developed and published by MicroProse. Released as freeware by Atari in 2011 on GOG.com. The rights were brought by Tommo in 2015 and, after the expiration of the deal with Atari, began to charge for it.
 Gateway (1992), an adventure game by Legend Entertainment.
 Grand Theft Auto (1997)
 Grand Theft Auto 2 (1999)
 Red Baron 3D (1998), a flight game by Sierra.
 Rise and Fall: Civilizations at War (2006), a real-time strategy/third-person shooter by Stainless Steel Studios and Midway Games. Re-released as ad-supported freeware, sponsored by the US Air Force.
 The Sims 2 (2004), a life simulation game by Maxis and Electronic Arts. It was released as freeware for a limited time on Origin on July 16, 2014 to celebrate the 10th anniversary of The Sims 2. It was removed from Origin on July 31, 2014.
 The Suffering (2004), a horror third/first person shooter developed by Surreal Software and published by Midway Games. It was released free in September 2008 sponsored by the US Air Force, but is no longer available due to a new copyright holder.
 Tom Clancy's Ghost Recon (2001), a tactical shooter by Ubisoft. Released in an ad-supported free download version in 2007 for a limited time; available to US residents only.
Wild Metal Country (1999), was released as freeware in 2004 but is no longer available on the download page.
 Zero Tolerance (1994), a first person shooter developed by Technopop for Sega Mega Drive/Genesis. The ROMs of the game and its sequel were formerly offered by the owner Randel Reiss for free download. In 2021, however, the rights to both games were purchased by Piko Interactive, leding the download links for the ROMs to disappear from Technopop's website.
 Zork I, Zork II, Zork III, text adventure games by Infocom.

References

Freeware games